This is a list of beaches by province or territory in Canada.

British Columbia
 Crescent Beach
 English Bay (Vancouver) (including Sunset Beach, Second Beach and Third Beach)
 Jericho Beach
 Kitsilano, Vancouver
 Locarno Beach, Vancouver
 Long Beach, Pacific Rim
 Parksville
 Saltspring Island
 Qualicum Beach, Qualicum Beach
 Rathtrevor Beach Provincial Park, Parksville
 Spanish Bank, Vancouver
 White Rock Beach
 Wreck Beach, including Acadia Beach and Tower Beach, Vancouver

Manitoba
 Grand Beach
 Hillside Beach Manitoba
 Victoria Beach Manitoba

New Brunswick
 Parlee Beach

Ontario

 Borden Lake, Chapleau, Ontario
 Britannia Beach, Ottawa
 Cherry Beach, Toronto
 Crystal Beach
 Grand Bend Beach
 Kew Beach, Toronto
 Port Franks Beach
 Port Stanley Beach
 Sandbanks Beach
 Sauble Beach
 Wasaga Beach
 Port Dover Beach
 Turkey Point Beach

Prince Edward Island
 Cavendish Beach

See also
 List of beaches

References

Canada
Lists of landforms of Canada
Lists of tourist attractions in Canada